Kwadwo Poku (born 1 December 1993) is a Ghanaian professional footballer who last played as a midfielder for ASFA Yennenga.

Club career

Asante Kotoko 
Poku started his career with the youth side of Kumasi-based club Asante Kotoko. He rose through the ranks and became captain of their reserve side, leading them to the Northern sector reserves league in 2011.

Heart of Lions 
In 2013, Poku was sent on a one-year loan deal to Hearts of Lions in Kpando. On 24 April 2014, he scored a free-kick goal to equalize the scoreline in 45th minute in a match against Accra Hearts of Oak. The match went on and ended in a 2–1 victory in favour of Heart of Lions. He played a key role in the team finishing in second place in the 2013–14 Ghanaian Premier League. The team tried to broker a permanent deal with Asante Kotoko but he was recalled immediately the season ended.

Return to Kotoko 
Poku returned to Asante Kotoko in July 2014 after playing an instrumental role in the 2013–14 season during his loan spell at Heart of Lions. He was named in the team's squad list for the 2015 season and the 2015 CAF Champions League campaign. He made his debut for the club after coming on in the 70th minute of 1–1 draw against Medeama SC. At the end of the season, he played 17 league matches. He was later released by the club in November 2016 as he was deemed as surplus to the team.

ASFA/Yennenga 
In February 2018, he joined Burkinabe club ASFA Yennenga. He left the club July 2018. In November 2019, he was linked with a move to Ghanaian club King Faisal Babes.

References

External links 

 
 
 
 

Living people
1993 births
Association football midfielders
Ghanaian footballers
Asante Kotoko S.C. players
Heart of Lions F.C. players
ASFA Yennenga players
Ghana Premier League players
Burkinabé Premier League players
Ghanaian expatriate footballers
Ghanaian expatriate sportspeople in Burkina Faso
Expatriate footballers in Burkina Faso